Constantin Ionescu-Mihăești (1883-1962) was a Romanian physician who specialized in microbiology and anatomical pathology. He became a titular member of the Romanian Academy in 1945.

Notes

1883 births
1962 deaths
Romanian pathologists
Romanian microbiologists
Titular members of the Romanian Academy